Mari Albert Johan van Manen (Nijmegen, 16 April 1877 – Kolkata, 17 March 1943) was a Dutch orientalist and the first Dutch Tibetologist. A large portion of his collected manuscripts and art and ethnographic projects now make up the Van Manen collection at Leiden University's Kern Institute.

Career
Beginning in 1908 he resided at the Theosophical Society headquarters in Adyar, near Chennai, India, and worked as the secretary of C. W. Leadbeater. In 1908 he was appointed as assistant librarian at the Adyar Library.

in 1916-18 he moved lived in Ghoom in the Darjeeling Himalayan hill region of northeastern India and studied Tibetan culture and language.

From 1919 until his death in 1943 he lived in Calcutta, working first as librarian for the Imperial Library and then as an assistant in the Indian Museum, as the General Secretary of the Royal Asiatic Society of Bengal, and finally, during the Second World War, as an official in the censor's office.

He died on 17 March 1943.

References

Further reading
 Peter Richardus, The Dutch Orientalist Johan van Manen: His Life and Work, Leiden: The Kern Institure, 1989

External links
 Van Manen, Johan at Theospophy World

Tibetologists
People from Nijmegen
1877 births
1943 deaths
Dutch orientalists